Fire on the Bayou is the sixth studio album by the funk band The Meters.

Background and release

This was the band's first album with Cyril Neville as a member. At the time, the band's headlining performances were receiving good reviews. According to a review in The Real Paper, "they could blow virtually any other band in the country right off the stage." The album was released in July 1975, at a time when the band was opening for the Rolling Stones on their U.S. Tour. The album sold 88,000 copies and didn't meet the record label's expectations. According to Rupert Surcouf, the band's road manager at the time, the record label realized "the Meters didn't fit into any conventional mold", and the label had difficulty promoting the music.

Reception

Stephen Erlewine of AllMusic had a positive view and wrote "there never seems to be a concession to mainstream funk" and called the music "simmering". Ed Ward of Rolling Stone had a negative view and called the music "aimless" in comparison to the band's early works. Robert Christgau had a mixed view and gave the album a B-rating.

Track listing

Personnel
Credits adapted in part from AllMusic.

The Meters
George Porter Jr. – bass guitar, producer, backing vocals
Joseph Modeliste – drums, producer, vocals, graphic design, photo courtesy
Leo Nocentelli – guitar, producer, backing vocals
Art Neville – keyboards, producer, vocals
Cyril Neville – congas, percussion, producer, vocals

Additional composition
Wardell Quezergue – horn arrangements

Production
Allen Toussaint – producer 
Marshall Sehorn – executive producer, remixing 
Efram Turchick – project manager 
Tim Livingston – project manager 
Roberta Grace – engineer 
Ken Laxton – engineer, remixing 
Bob Irwin – mastering 
Al Quaglieri – mastering 
Bunny Matthews – liner notes 
Rich Russell – design 
Paul Howrilla (aka Paul Andrew) – graphic design, photo courtesy of Photographique Studios, Inc.

References

1975 albums
The Meters albums
Albums produced by Allen Toussaint
Reprise Records albums